The Hard Rock Live is an indoor amphitheater at the Seminole Hard Rock Hotel and Casino in Hollywood, Florida. The theater opened on October 25, 2019, as part of a $1.5 billion property-wide expansion, which also included a new 450-foot guitar shaped hotel tower, an expanded casino, new dining and retail options, and new amenities.

History
The venue originally opened on July 12, 2005, as a 5,500-seat multi-purpose arena, which hosted music and comedy shows, sporting events including world championship boxing, mixed martial arts, tennis, basketball and rodeo events, and corporate meetings, celebrity charity fundraisers and exhibitions.

The arena has hosted numerous music acts, including Eric Clapton, Aerosmith, Janet Jackson, B.B. King, Willie Nelson, Staind, Bon Jovi, The Who,  The Killers, Patti LaBelle, Bruce Springsteen, Billy Joel, Gloria Estefan, Rod Stewart, Def Leppard, Ringo Starr, Prince, Paul McCartney, Andrea Bocelli, Tim McGraw, Fergie and Post Malone. The 2008 concert of classic rock band Bad Company at the venue was recorded for a 2010 release on CD and DVD. The arena was also home to the Florida Frenzy indoor football team.

As part of a $1.5 billion property-wide expansion, the arena was razed in March 2018 to be replaced by the new theater, which opened on October 25, 2019, with a concert by Maroon 5. During the theater's construction, events were held in the temporary 3,500 seat Hard Rock Event Center, which opened in March 2018. The theater hosted the Miss Universe 2020 coronation night on May 16, 2021.

References

Basketball venues in Florida
Boxing venues in the United States
Hard Rock Cafe
Indoor arenas in Florida
Mixed martial arts venues in Florida
Music venues in Florida
Sports venues in Florida
Tennis venues in Florida
Sports venues completed in 2005
Event venues established in 2005
2005 establishments in Florida